The Feast of Christ the Priest is a Roman Catholic moveable liturgical feast celebrated annually on the first Thursday after Pentecost. Approval for this feast was first granted by the Congregation for Divine Worship and the Discipline of the Sacraments in 1987. In 2012 the Congregation sent a letter to all conferences of bishops, offering the feast to be inscribed in their respective liturgical calendars if they ask for it.

It is observed by the Confraternity of Christ the Priest in Australia and all the Roman Catholic dioceses of Spain. Since 2013, it has been observed in Poland (Decree, 3 April 2013)  in the Netherlands the following year, since 2015 in Czech Republic. The feast was introduced into the liturgy and Divine Office in England and Wales in 2018.

Significance
The feast focuses firstly on Jesus’ Priestly Office (Latin: Munus sacerdotale). He is considered the model for believers, and for the clergy in particular, with priests acting In persona Christi (“In the person of Christ”). The laity are thus urged to pray that priests would be more like Christ, the compassionate and trustworthy high priest (Hebrews 2:17), ever-living to intercede for humanity before The Father (Heb 7:25).

The Second Vatican Council taught many things about the Priesthood of Christ, and sharing in that one Priesthood through the Sacraments of Baptism and Holy Orders. This development has been reflected in many subsequent documents. One effective way to build upon this teaching is to establish the Feast of Christ the Priest more widely.

What Pope Pius XI wrote about the feast in honor of Christ’s Kingly Office can be said just as truly about this feast in honor of Our Lord’s Priesthood:

Liturgical aspects
The feast has its own proper texts for the Mass, as for the Votive Mass of the Blessed Eucharist B. 

The feast also has approved Latin, Spanish and English texts for the Divine Office or the Liturgy of the Hours.

The entry from the Roman Martyrology (2005) reads:

References

External links
 christthepriest.com

Catholic holy days
Holidays based on the date of Easter